Neotestudina is a genus of fungi in the family Testudinaceae.

References

Pleosporales